Blox may refer to:

 , a former Polish blog service hosted by Agora
  Blox CMS, a content management system
 BLOX, a building on Christians Brygge, Copenhagen, which houses the Danish Architecture Centre and the Danish Design Centre
 , a building in Dejvice, Prague
 John E. Blox (1810–1860), American priest

See also 
 
 Bloc (disambiguation)
 Block (disambiguation)
 Bloch (disambiguation)
 Roblox